The Defence Industry of Pakistan, under the Ministry of Defence Production, was created in September 1951 to promote and coordinate the patchwork of military production facilities that have developed since independence. The ministry also includes seven other specialized organizations devoted to research and development, production, and administration.

Pakistan Navy is supported mainly by a facility at the Karachi Shipyard, which has limited production capacity. In 1987, development of a submarine repair and rebuild facility at Port Qasim was begun. By early 2000, in a joint project with China led to the development of the JF-17 Thunder fighter and the Al-Khalid Tank. Pakistan also has taken major steps to becoming self-sufficient in aircraft overhaul, modernization and tank and helicopter sales, and a transfer of technology with France led to the construction of the Agosta B-90 Submarine in the late 1990s and early 2000s. The two countries are participating in many joint production projects such as Al Khalid II, advance trainer aircraft, combat aircraft, navy ships and submarines. In 2016, the Pakistani government managed to reduce its defence imports by 90%.

Suppliers

Local suppliers 
Several of the defence firms listed below, while primarily involved in research and development, also produce and supply defence equipment and military systems:

 Cavalier Group
 Daudsons Armoury
 Global Industrial Defence Solutions (GIDS)
 Heavy Industries Taxila
 Heavy Mechanical Complex
 Integrated Dynamics
 Karachi Shipyard & Engineering Works (KSEW)
 Khan Research Laboratories
 National Engineering and Scientific Commission (NESCOM)
 Air Weapons Complex
 National Defence Complex
 Maritime Technological Complex
 National Radio & Telecommunication Corporation (NRTC)
 Pakistan Aeronautical Complex
 Pakistan Ordnance Factories
 SATUMA
 SHIBLI

Foreign suppliers 
Pakistan is also equipped with foreign hardware. According to a 2021 report by the Stockholm International Peace Research Institute, Pakistan ranked 10th in the world among the largest arms importers for the period 2016-20. China was the main supplier of arms during that time, with a 74% share. It was followed by Russia (6.6%) and Italy (5.9%). Compared to the previous period 2011-15, Pakistan reduced its foreign arm imports by 23%. Listed below are the main foreign suppliers to Pakistan:

Research and Development Institutions
The defence establishments & institutions listed below are solely involved in research and development in various fields and are not involved in production or supplying of military systems or defence equipment. Products designed by these institutions are manufactured in other state-owned companies.

 Armament Research and Development Establishment (ARDE)
 Defence Science and Technology Organization (DESTO)
 Institute of Optronics
 Metallurgical Laboratory (Wah)
 Military Vehicles Research and Development Establishment (MVRDE)
 Space and Upper Atmosphere Research Commission (SUPARCO)

See also
Defence Export Promotion Organization
 List of military equipment manufactured in Pakistan

References

External links
Defence supplier establishments of Pakistan
Pakistan finalising arrangements to target global arms market
Pakistan pushing military exports
Pakistan - Arms exports values
Pakistan Defense Industrial Base Comparison: Lt. Gen. Sarath Chand, Vice Chief of Army Staff (VCOAS) Indian Army

Pakistan
Industries of Pakistan